Swap Magic is a specialized PlayStation 2 game disc used for tricking the console into reading non-retail or burned game discs, homebrew software, or games outside the console's region. The software has existed since at least mid-2003, with several different versions of the disc having been developed.

Swap Magic and its related mods, such as the Magic Switch and Swap Tool, which are used to allow the user to swap discs without the system being aware, are notable over other methods (such as a modchip) due to the fact that they do not void the PS2's warranty.

Features 
The Swap Magic disc allows the user to boot into software which allows the system to read discs that it would normally refuse because of the lack of a burst cutting area on discs that have been burned with an ordinary DVD drive, as opposed to regular retail discs which are stamped or pressed en masse. The user then removes the disc (after installing small modifications to prevent the system from detecting the drive being opened) and replaces it with another disc which can then be started. The software also allows other homebrew software to be run from a memory card or USB flash drive.

Swap Magic and most other non-Sony-made PlayStation 2 bootable discs use a method of "growing" and "splicing" stampers from original PlayStation 2 discs, a method of growing a stamper from an original game disc and joining a new stamper with the program data on to it; in essence, the resulting discs contain a portion of an original disc. 

Datel, the first company outside Sony to make a bootable PlayStation 2 disc, researched the protection and produced their own discs with protection in their on-site mastering facility.

IFPI 
The IFPI on a DVD can be found on the inner ring on the underside (data side) of the disc, before the start of data in the mirror part of the disc's hub. Most contain text specified at the time of mastering; this usually consists of the string "IFPI" followed by a code describing the mastering system used, then followed by a text product description, and finally a bar code.

Development 
Swap Magic v1 was released and is compatible with the v12 slim PS2. Swap Magic v2 was released after Sony had slightly changed the design of their console in the v13-15 models of the slim PS2, and Swap Magic v1 did not work with those models. Version 2 was widely criticized as it required the user to open the console and, therefore, voided the warranty. The company responded to this criticism by releasing Swap Magic v3, which did not require any opening of the console.

CODER 
Swap Magic v3.8 (also known as CODER) was released, which adds the ability of loading Action Replay cheats into the booted game, as well as the ability to load an ELF file from usb or memory card. However, some users have complained that CODER has some compatibility issues as well as known bugs. For example, some games that work on v3.6 do not work with CODER. Consequently, v3.6 remains the most popular version of Swap Magic, though the ability to boot an ELF file allows for soft modding of the PS2.

References 

PlayStation 2